The 1925 Regis Rangers football team was an American football team that represented Regis College as an independent during the 1925 college football season. The team compiled a 2–3 record and outscored opponents by a total of 68 to 40.

Schedule

References

Regis
Regis Rangers football seasons
Regis Rangers football